Twenty-seven candidates contested the 1999 Ontario provincial election as independent candidates, affiliated with the Communist Party of Canada - Marxist-Leninist.  None were elected.

List
Beaches—East York: Steve Rutchinski
Broadview—Greenwood: Melanie Cishecki
Davenport: Barbara Seed
Don Valley East: Fernand Deschamps
Don Valley West: Judith Snow
Essex: Enver Villamizar
Etobicoke Centre: Elaine Couto
Etobicoke—Lakeshore: Janice Murray
Etobicoke North: Diane Johnston
Guelph—Wellington: Anna Di Carlo
Hamilton East: Julie Gordon
Hamilton Mountain: Rolf Gerstenberger
Hamilton West: Wendell Fields
Kitchener Centre: Julian Ichim
Kitchener—Waterloo: Helmut Braun
Mississauga East: Pierre Chenier
Mississauga South: Tim Sullivan
Ottawa Centre: Mistahi Corkill
Ottawa South: Mag Carson
Ottawa—Vanier: Kevin Corkill
Ottawa West—Nepean: Megan Hnatiw
St. Catharines: Ron Walker
St. Paul's: Philip Fernandez
Stoney Creek: Paul Lane
Windsor West: Robert Cruise
York South—Weston: David Gershuny
York West: Nicholas Lin

Independent candidates in Ontario provincial elections
Ontario 1999